Enrico Lo Verso (born 18 January 1964) is an Italian actor.

He studied acting at Centro Sperimentale di Cinematografia and INDA|Istituto Nazionale del Dramma Antico.

Filmography
 Atto di dolore (1990)
 A Season of Giants (1990) - Sculptor
 Nulla ci può fermare (1990)
 Vendetta: Secrets of a Mafia Bride (1990, TV)
 Hudson Hawk  (1991) - Apprentice
 I tarassachi (1991
 Stolen Children (Il ladro di bambini, 1992) - Antonio
 Le amiche del cuore (1992)
 Volevamo essere gli U2 (1992)
 The Escort (1993) - Andrea Corsale
 Mario, Maria e Mario (1993) - Mario Della Rocca
 Farinelli (1994) - Riccardo Broschi
 Lamerica (1994) - Gino
 Il cielo è sempre più blu (1995) - Postman
 Mosè (Moses; 1995, TV) - Joshua
 Come mi vuoi (1996)
 Naja (1997 film) (1997) - Carmelo
 Così ridevano (1998) -  Giovanni
 Del perduto amore (1998) - Dott. Satriano
 Li chiamarono... briganti! (1999) - Carmine Crocco
  (1999) -  Gilles
 Les Misérables (2000, TV miniseries) -  Marius
 Judas (2001, TV) – Judas
 Hannibal (2001) - Gnocco
 L'amore imperfetto (2001)
 Tre giorni d'anarchia (2004)
 L'Educazione Fisica delle Fanciulle (2005)
 Alatriste (2006) - Gualterio Malatesta
 Salvatore - Questa è la vita (2006) -  Marco Brioni
 The Inquiry (2006)
 Mirush (2007) - Bekim
 Milano-Palermo: il ritorno (2007) – Rocco Scalia
 Una madre (2008) (TV) - Rocco
 Baaria - La porta del vento (2009) -  Minicu
 Room in Rome (2010) – Max
 September Eleven 1683 (2012) - Kara Mustafa
 Nomi e cognomi (2015)
 Quel bravo ragazzo (2016)
 Raffaello - Il Principe delle Arti in 3D (2017)
 Michelangelo - Infinito (2018)

External links

1964 births
Italian male film actors
Living people
Male actors from Palermo
Centro Sperimentale di Cinematografia alumni
20th-century Italian male actors
21st-century Italian male actors
Italian male television actors